The tachykinin receptor 1 (TACR1) also known as neurokinin 1 receptor (NK1R) or substance P receptor (SPR) is a G protein coupled receptor found in the central nervous system and peripheral nervous system.  The endogenous ligand for this receptor is Substance P, although it has some affinity for other tachykinins.  The protein is the product of the TACR1 gene.

Properties 
Tachykinins are a family of neuropeptides that share the same hydrophobic C-terminal region with the amino acid sequence Phe-X-Gly-Leu-Met-NH2, where X represents a hydrophobic residue that is either an aromatic or a beta-branched aliphatic. The N-terminal region varies between different tachykinins. The term tachykinin originates in the rapid onset of action caused by the peptides in smooth muscles. Substance P (SP) is the most researched and potent member of the tachykinin family. It is an undecapeptide with the amino acid sequence Arg-Pro-Lys-Pro-Gln-Gln-Phe-Phe-Gly-Leu-Met-NH2. SP binds to all three of the tachykinin receptors, but it binds most strongly to the NK1 receptor.

Tachykinin NK1 receptor consists of 407 amino acid residues, and it has a molecular weight of 58,000. NK1 receptor, as well as the other tachykinin receptors, is made of seven hydrophobic transmembrane (TM) domains with three extracellular and three intracellular loops, an amino-terminus and a cytoplasmic carboxy-terminus. The loops have functional sites, including two cysteines amino acids for a disulfide bridge, Asp-Arg-Tyr, which is responsible for association with arrestin and, Lys/Arg-Lys/Arg-X-X-Lys/Arg, which interacts with G-proteins. The binding site for substance P and other agonists and antagonists is found between the second and third transmembrane domains. The NK-1 receptor is found on human chromosome 2 and is located on the cell's surface as a cytoplasmic receptor.

Distribution and function 
The NK1 receptor can be found in both the central and peripheral nervous system. It is present in neurons, brainstem, vascular endothelial cells, muscle, gastrointestinal tracts, genitourinary tract, pulmonary tissue, thyroid gland and different types of immune cells. The binding of SP to the NK1 receptor has been associated with the transmission of stress signals and pain, the contraction of smooth muscles and inflammation. NK1 receptor antagonists have also been studied in migraine, emesis and psychiatric disorders. In fact, aprepitant has been proved effective in a number of pathophysiological models of anxiety and depression. Other diseases in which the NK1 receptor system is involved include asthma, rheumatoid arthritis and gastrointestinal disorders.

Mechanism 
SP is synthesized by neurons and transported to synaptic vesicles; the release of SP is accomplished through the depolarizing action of calcium-dependent mechanisms.
When NK1 receptors are stimulated, they can generate various second messengers, which can trigger a wide range of effector mechanisms that regulate cellular excitability and function. One of those three well-defined, independent second messenger systems is stimulation, via phospholipase C, of phosphatidyl inositol, turnover leading to Ca mobilization from both intra- and extracellular sources. Second is the arachidonic acid mobilization via phospholipase A2 and third is the cAMP accumulation via stimulation of adenylate cyclase. It has also been reported that SP elicits interleukin-1 (IL-1) production in macrophages, it is known to sensitize neutrophils and enhance dopamine release in the substantia nigra region in cat brain. From spinal neurons, SP is known to evoke release of neurotransmitters like acetylcholine, histamine and GABA. It is also known to secrete catecholamines and play a role in the regulation of blood pressure and hypertension. Likewise, SP is known to bind to N-methyl-D-aspartate (NMDA) receptors by eliciting excitation with calcium ion influx, which further releases nitric oxide. Studies in frogs have shown that SP elicits the release of prostaglandin E2 and prostacyclin by the arachidonic acid pathway, which leads to an increase in corticosteroid output.

In combination therapy, NK1 receptor antagonists appear to offer better control of delayed emesis and post-operative emesis than drug therapy without NK1 receptor antagonists. NK1 receptor antagonists block responses to a broader range of emetic stimuli than the established 5-HT3 antagonist treatments. It has been reported that centrally-acting NK1 receptors antagonists, such as CP-99994, inhibit emesis induced by apomorphine and loperimidine, which are two compounds that act through central mechanisms.

Clinical significance 
This receptor is considered an attractive drug target, particularly with regards to potential analgesics and anti-depressants. It is also a potential treatment for alcoholism and opioid addiction. In addition, it has been identified as a candidate in the etiology of bipolar disorder. Finally NK1R antagonists may also have a role as novel antiemetics and hypnotics.

Ligands
Many selective ligands for NK1 are now available, several of which have gone into clinical use as antiemetics.

Agonists
 GR-73632 - potent and selective agonist, EC50 2nM, 5-amino acid polypeptide chain. CAS# 133156-06-6

Antagonists
 Aprepitant
 Casopitant
 Elinzanetant
 Ezlopitant
 Fosaprepitant
 Lanepitant
 Maropitant
 Vestipitant
 L-733,060
 L-741,671
 L-742,694
 RP-67580 - potent and selective antagonist, Ki 2.9nM, (3aR,7aR)-Octahydro-2-[1-imino-2-(2-methoxyphenyl)ethyl ]-7,7-diphenyl-4H-isoindol, CAS# 135911-02-3
 RPR-100,893
 CP-96345
 CP-99994
 GR-205,171
 TAK-637
 T-2328

See also 
 NK1 receptor antagonist
 Tachykinin receptor
 Discovery and development of neurokinin 1 receptor antagonists

References

Further reading

External links 
 
 
 

G protein-coupled receptors
Molecular neuroscience
Biology of bipolar disorder